Titsal Wood, Shadingfield is a  biological Site of Special Scientific Interest south-west of Shadingfield in Suffolk.

This ancient coppice with standards wood is mainly hornbeam, but it also has young oak and ash standards. The ground flora is rich and ancient, including common spotted orchid, wood bitter-cress and the rare thin-spiked wood sedge.

The site is private land with no public access.

References

Sites of Special Scientific Interest in Suffolk